Amor se dice cantando ("Love is Said Singing") is a 1959 Mexican- Argentine comedy-drama film directed by Miguel Morayta and written by María Luisa Algarra. It stars Miguel Aceves Mejía and Julia Sandoval.

Cast
Miguel Aceves Mejía
Julia Sandoval
Alfredo Almanza
Paulette Christian
Luis Dávila
Tito Licausi
Mario Pocoví
María Esther Podestá
Mariela Reyes
Ethel Rojo
Fernando Soto

Release
The film was first shown in Mexico on 22 February 1959.

External links

 Credits

1959 films
1959 comedy-drama films
1950s Spanish-language films
Argentine black-and-white films
Mexican black-and-white films
Films directed by Miguel Morayta
Mexican comedy-drama films
1959 comedy films
1959 drama films
Argentine comedy-drama films
1950s Argentine films
1950s Mexican films